Minhla Township is a township in Tharrawaddy District in the Bago Region of Burma (Myanmar). The principal town is Minhla. Minhla was occupied during the Third Anglo-Burmese War. The township is hilly, and is inhabited by the Arakan Yoma.

References

Townships of the Bago Region
Tharrawaddy District